Angela Marsons is a British author of crime fiction, from the Black Country in the West Midlands.  She has sold more than three-and-a-half million copies of her novels, which have been translated into 28 languages.

Writing career
Angela Marsons is from Brierley Hill in the West Midlands and is a former security guard at the Merry Hill Shopping Centre.  Having been rejected by numerous publishers over 25 years, she released three books in her crime series in 2015 under digital publisher Bookouture.  Her books all have a Black Country setting,  but the author says "I never write about a set group of people or anyone particular I know, all my characters are make believe."  The principal character in the crime series is Detective Kim Stone.  The success of the digitally-published Kim Stone books resulted in a print deal with publisher Bonnier Publishing Fiction. Marsons is signed to Bookouture for a total of 16 books in the Kim Stone series. In 2020, Marsons signed a deal with Bookoture for an extra 12 books in the Kim Stone series, bringing the total to 28.

Bibliography

Kim Stone novels
 Silent Scream - 20 February 2015, 
 Evil Games - 29 May 2015, 
 Lost Girls - 6 November 2015, 
 Play Dead - 20 May 2016, 
 Blood Lines - 4 November 2016, 
 Dead Souls - 28 April 2017, 
 Broken Bones - 3 November 2017, 
 Dying Truth - 18 May 2018, 
 Fatal Promise - 19 October 2018, 
 Dead Memories - 22 February 2019, 
 Child's Play - 11 July 2019, 
 First Blood - 14 November 2019, 
 Killing Mind - 13 May 2020, 
 Deadly Cry - 13 November 2020,

Other works
 Dear Mother - 1 February 2014, 
 The Forgotten Woman - 12 October 2016,

References

External links
 Author's website

Living people
British crime fiction writers
People from Brierley Hill
Year of birth missing (living people)